Mike Turner (born February 6, 1955) is a Tennessee politician who sat in the Tennessee House of Representatives representing District 51, which is composed of part of Davidson County and includes Old Hickory. He is a member of the Tennessee Democratic Party.

Early life and education
The son of Joyce and Johnny Turner, Mike graduated from Dupont High School and also attended Middle Tennessee State University, Tennessee State University, and the National Fire Academy. Former Representative Turner attends Old Hickory Methodist Church.

Political career
Mike Turner served the people of District 51 in the Tennessee General Assembly from 1999 - 2014. He served as the Chairman of the House Democratic Caucus. Chairman Turner served on the Education Committee, the State and Local Government Committee, the Health Committee and the Calendar & Rules Committee.

Before being elected in 1999, Representative Turner served as the Political Director for the Tennessee Professional Fire Firefighters serving in Nashville and Washington, D.C. for over 13 years. Former Representative Turner also currently works as a Fire Captain for Company 3 of the Nashville Fire Department.

References 

(1) http://www.capitol.tn.gov/house/members/h51.html
(2) https://web.archive.org/web/20131126074220/http://repmiketurner.com/about.php
(3) https://web.archive.org/web/20130102050806/http://www.tnhdc.com/view_rep.php?id=52
(4) http://www.nashvillescene.com/pitw/archives/2012/10/01/rep-mike-turner-says-tennessee-voters-hate-obama-because-hes-black
(5) http://www.nashvillescene.com/pitw/archives/2012/03/22/house-dem-leader-lashes-out-at-gop-as-tennessee-taliban
(6) http://votesmart.org/candidate/biography/48915/michael-turner#.Uo2JKyf9148
(7) http://www.capitol.tn.gov/house/archives/100GA/h51.htm
(8) https://archive.today/20131121050000/http://www.wsmv.com/topics/mike-turner.htm
(9) http://www.wsmv.com/story/23885215/turner-to-step-down-as-caucus-chairman
(10) http://www.wsmv.com/story/16444946/gop-to-unveil-redistricting-plan-for-tenn-house
(11) http://openstates.org/tn/legislators/TNL000124/
(12) http://blogs.tennessean.com/politics/tag/mike-turner/
(13) https://archive.today/20131121050831/http://blogs.knoxnews.com/humphrey/2013/04/mike-turner-on-end-of-legislat.html
(14) http://blogs.tennessean.com/politics/2012/tn-republicans-ask-mike-turner-to-apologize-for-racism-remark/

1955 births
Living people
People from Old Hickory, Tennessee
Democratic Party members of the Tennessee House of Representatives